

Keens Steakhouse (formerly Keen’s English Chop House) is a steakhouse restaurant located at 72 West 36th Street (between Fifth Avenue and Sixth Avenue) in the Garment District in Manhattan, New York City. The restaurant houses more than 50,000 clay smoking pipes, making it one of the largest collections in the world. The establishment is also famous for their renowned mutton chops.

History
The restaurant was founded in 1885 by Albert Keen in Herald Square, what was then the Theater District. It is also the only surviving establishment of the former district. 

A 1954 New York City tourist guide described Keen's as, "An historic and unusual inn type restaurant, featuring English mutton chops steak and roast specialties; seats 350 in several dining rooms, with old English decor. Home of the Pipe Club; bar; no entertainment. Open lunch and dinner daily, except Sunday. Moderately expensive."

Patrons were given the opportunity to store fragile clay pipes at the restaurant so as to not risk breakage during transportation. The membership roster of the Pipe Club contained over 90,000 names. Today some of the more well-known patrons’ pipes are on display including:

Theodore Roosevelt
Babe Ruth
Dr. Ruth Westheimer (Dr. Ruth) - honorary
Stephen King - honorary
Liza Minnelli - honorary
Dr. Renee Richards - honorary
John Barrymore
David Belasco
“Buffalo Bill” Cody
George M. Cohan
Albert Einstein
General Douglas MacArthur
Grace Moore
J.P. Morgan
Will Rogers
Billy Rose
Adlai Stevenson
Stanford White

In 2013, Zagats gave it a food rating of 26, and rated it the # 2 restaurant in the Garment District, and the 7th-best steakhouse in New York City.

Keens is the second-oldest steakhouse in New York City after the Old Homestead Steakhouse. Keens changed ownership and closed for renovation in 1979. It reopened under the new name.

See also
 List of James Beard America's Classics
 List of the oldest restaurants in the United States
 List of restaurants in New York City
 List of steakhouses

References

External links

 
Anthony Bourdain’s Guide to Disappearing New York

1885 establishments in New York (state)
James Beard Foundation Award winners
Restaurants in Manhattan
Steakhouses in New York City
Restaurants established in 1885